Abbi Moloney (born 30 August 2002) is a professional Australian rules footballer who played for the Collingwood Football Club in the AFL Women's (AFLW). She played for Sandringham Dragons in the NAB League before she was drafted by Collingwood. She is the daughter of Troy Moloney and the granddaughter of Brian Moloney.

Early life and state football
Moloney started playing football with East Malvern Knights at the age of 10, where she was coached by her father, Troy Moloney. She later played for Mentone Grammar School and joined Sandringham Dragons in 2019.

AFLW career
Moloney was drafted to Collingwood with the 31st pick of the 2020 AFL Women's draft, which was Collingwood's fourth and final pick. She played in her first official hit-out in the first practice match of the season, playing against North Melbourne at Ikon Park. She made her debut in the sixth round of the 2021 AFL Women's season at Victoria Park against Western Bulldogs, the club her father and grandfather played for.

In March 2023, Moloney was delisted by Collingwood after playing nine games.

Personal life
Moloney's father, Troy Moloney, played 36 games for Footscray and her grandfather, Brian Moloney played 17 games for them.

Statistics
Statistics are correct to the end of the S7 (2022) season.

|- 
! scope="row" style="text-align:center" | 2021
|style="text-align:center;"|
| 40 || 2 || 2 || 0 || 3 || 0 || 3 || 2 || 3 || 1.0 || 0.0 || 1.5 || 0.0 || 1.5 || 1.0 || 1.5
|- 
! scope="row" style="text-align:center" | 2022
|style="text-align:center;"|
| 40 || 4 || 2 || 2 || 16 || 6 || 22 || 6 || 7 || 0.5 || 0.5 || 4.0 || 1.5 || 5.5 || 1.5 || 1.8
|- 
! scope="row" style="text-align:center" | S7 (2022)
|style="text-align:center;"|
| 40 || 3 || 1 || 0 || 7 || 3 || 10 || 3 || 4 || 0.3 || 0.0 || 2.3 || 1.0 || 3.3 || 1.0 || 1.3
|- class="sortbottom"
! colspan=3| Career
! 9
! 5
! 2
! 26
! 9
! 35
! 11
! 14
! 0.6
! 0.2
! 2.9
! 1.0
! 3.9
! 1.2
! 1.6
|}

References

External links
 
 

2002 births
Living people
Collingwood Football Club (AFLW) players
Australian rules footballers from Victoria (Australia)
Sportswomen from Victoria (Australia)